Sachchidananda Sinha (10 November 1871 – 6 March 1950) was an Indian lawyer, parliamentarian, and journalist. He is considered to be the father of Modern Bihar and first president of the Indian constitutional assembly which drafted the constitution of India.

Early life
Sinha was born on 10 November 1871 in Arrah, in Bengal Presidency (in present-day Bihar) into a well-to-do Srivastava Kayastha family who had served for several generations for Dumraon Raj. His father was educated in Patna and City College, Calcutta. He studied law in Inner Temple, London to become a barrister. Following his return from London, Sinha began a movement for a separate province of Bihar with a small group of others. It was realized in 1912 with the formation of the Bihar and Orissa Province.

Career
Sinha began his career as an advocate in 1893 practicing in the Calcutta High Court. He subsequently practiced in the Allahabad High Court starting in 1896 where he met Justice Khuda Bakhsh Khan who gave him the responsibility to run the Khuda Bakhsh oriental public library as its secretary from 1894 - 1898 and became one of his mentor, He started practicing in Patna High Court starting in 1916.

In his early years, Sinha was a member of the Indian National Congress, from 1899 till 1920, serving one term as secretary. He participated in the Home Rule League Movement.

He was one of the vice-chancellors of Patna University and held the post from 1936 to 1944. He built the Sinha Library in 1924 in memory of his wife, Radhika.

He was a member of the Imperial Legislative Council from 1910 to 1920 and the Indian Legislative Assembly. He was Deputy President of the Assembly in 1921. He also held the office of the President in the Bihar and Orissa Legislative Council. He was appointed Executive Councillor and Finance Member of the Government of Bihar and Orissa, and, thus, was the first Indian who was ever appointed a Finance Member of a Province. Later, he also was a member of the Bihar Legislative Assembly..

On 9 December 1946, after the first Constituent Assembly election, the first meeting of Constituent Assembly was held in which Dr. Sachchidananda Sinha was selected as the temporary President of Constituent Assembly as he was the eldest member, following the French Practice.

A constituent college in Aurangabad is dedicated to him and was named Sachchidanand Sinha College, which was founded by Akhouri Krishna Prakash Sinha along with eminent Gandhian Anugrah Narayan Sinha before independence, in 1943, who named it after Sinha, as a living tribute to him, who was at that time 72 years of age.

In January 2015, when US President Barack Obama visited India, he was presented with a copy of the first telegram sent from the US to India. It was sent by then acting secretary of state Dean Acheson to Sinha.

Author
Sinha was a journalist and a writer. He was the publisher of the Indian Nation and editor of Hindustan Review. His works included Some Eminent Indian Contemporaries and Iqbal: The Poet and His Message (1947).

References

Further reading
 Pratyush Kumar, Madan Mishra (eds.), Recollections and Reminiscences of a Long Life by Dr. Sachchidanand Sinha (Foreword by: Domenico Francavilla; Afterword by: Mahendra Prasad Singh), New Delhi: Anamika Publishers, 2022.

19th-century Indian educational theorists
1871 births
1950 deaths
English-language writers from India
Academic staff of Patna University
People from Bhojpur district, India
Members of the Imperial Legislative Council of India
Members of the Central Legislative Assembly of India
Bihari politicians
Indian barristers
Journalists from Bihar
19th-century Indian politicians
20th-century Indian politicians
Indian National Congress politicians from Bihar
Indian male journalists
19th-century Indian journalists
20th-century Indian journalists
19th-century Indian male writers
20th-century Indian educational theorists
19th-century Indian lawyers
20th-century Indian lawyers
Scholars from Bihar